Punta de Piedras may refer to:

 Punta de Piedras, Magdalena, Colombia
 Punta de Piedras, Nueva Esparta, Venezuela